Once to Every Bachelor is a 1934 American drama film directed by William Nigh and starring Marian Nixon, Neil Hamilton and William Austin.

Synopsis
In order to avoid her connection to the murder of a gangster and his desire to avoid a scandal by being named as a co-respondent in a divorce case, Natalie and society playboy Lyle decide to marry shortly after first meeting. They agree on a marriage of convenience, with a honeymoon in Paris. They sail for Europe on a liner, and Natalie begins to develop feeling for him despite their agreement. Matters are complicated by the presence onboard of Judy, Lyle's former lover and her husband.

Cast
 Marian Nixon as Natalie Stuart
 Neil Hamilton as Lyle Stuart
 William Austin as Mathews
 Raymond Hatton as Uncle John
 Aileen Pringle as Judy Bryant
 Kathleen Howard as Aunt Henrietta
 Ralf Harolde as Schuyler
 Bradley Page as District Attorney Jerry Landers
 George Irving as George Bryant
 Don Alvarado as Rocco

References

Bibliography
 Goble, Alan. The Complete Index to Literary Sources in Film. Walter de Gruyter, 1999.

External links
 

1934 films
1934 drama films
American drama films
Films directed by William Nigh
Films set on ships
1930s English-language films
1930s American films